Pombe may refer to:
 Schizosaccharomyces pombe, the fission yeast, a yeast species used as a model organism in molecular and cell biology
 Pombe beer, a type of locally made African millet beer